The 1905 Drake Bulldogs football team was an American football team that represented Drake University as an independent during the 1905 college football season. In January 1905, Drake hired Willie Heston, star halfback of Michigan, as its head football coach. Heston coached the Bulldogs for the 1905 season. In their only season under Heston, the Bulldogs compiled a 4–4 record and outscored opponents by a total of 151 to 141. 

The team played its home games at Haskins Field in Des Moines, Iowa.

Schedule

References

Drake
Drake Bulldogs football seasons
Drake Bulldogs football